Skyampoche Ri (also known as Aq Tash) is a mountain peak located at  above sea level in the eastern part of the Karakoram.

Location 
The peak is located in the North-east of Sasoma settlement in Ladakh.

References

Seven-thousanders of the Transhimalayas
Mountains of Ladakh